Noctubourgognea coppingeri is a moth of the family Noctuidae. It is found in the Magallanes and Antartica Chilena Region of Chile and Patagonia.

The wingspan is about 40 mm.

External links
 Noctuinae of Chile

Noctuinae